The Closet is a 2001 French comedy film written and directed by Francis Veber. It is about a man who pretends to be homosexual to keep his job, with absurd and unexpected consequences.

Plot
François Pignon, an unassuming divorced man with a teenage son who ignores him, lives a quiet and unremarkable life. When he learns he will be fired from his job as an accountant in a rubber factory, he contemplates suicide, but his new neighbor Jean-Pierre Belone, a former industrial psychologist, dissuades him from jumping from his balcony and suggests a way to keep his position. Belone proposes that Pignon start a rumor he is homosexual by inserting his image in sexually provocative snapshots of a gay couple in a bar and anonymously mailing them to his boss, Mr. Kopel. The factory's primary product is condoms, so the gay community's support is essential, and Kopel will have to keep Pignon on the payroll to avoid charges of anti-homosexual bigotry.

Pignon does not change his usual mild and self-effacing behavior and mannerisms in any way as part of his masquerade. But his supervisors and co-workers begin to regard him in a new light, seeing him as exotic rather than dull, and his life becomes unexpectedly and dramatically better. Félix Santini, a homophobic co-worker who used to harass him, is warned he could be fired for discrimination if he continues to belittle Pignon, so he begins to make friendly overtures.

The company enters a float in a local gay pride parade, and Pignon is coerced into riding on it; his estranged son sees him in the televised broadcast of the parade and tells his mother. The son is thrilled to learn his father, whom he has always considered bland and boring, has a wilder side, and expresses an interest in spending more time with him. His suspicious ex-wife invites Pignon to dinner and demands an explanation. He has by this point gained enough self-confidence to tell her exactly what he thinks of her.

Meanwhile, Santini's charade of friendship has developed into an obsessive attraction; his wife suspects him of having an affair when she finds a receipt for an expensive pink cashmere sweater, and leaves him when he buys Pignon chocolates.  After this, Santini invites Pignon to move in with him. When Pignon turns him down, Santini snaps, a fight ensues, and Santini is institutionalized to recover from his emotional breakdown.

Eventually, Pignon's ruse is discovered when Kopel catches him making love in the office to his co-worker, Mlle Bertrand. However, he has become so assertive that he keeps his job, relates to his son, patches up his relationship with Santini, cheers up Belone, and lives happily ever after.

Cast
 Daniel Auteuil as François Pignon
 Gérard Depardieu as Félix Santini
 Thierry Lhermitte as Guillaume
 Michel Aumont as Jean-Pierre Belone
 Michèle Laroque as Mademoiselle Bertrand
 Jean Rochefort as Kopel
 Laurent Gamelon as Alba
 Alexandra Vandernoot as Christine
 Michèle Garcia as Madame Santini
 Edgar Givry as Mathieu
 Armelle Deutsch as Ariane
 Vincent Moscato as Ponce
 Thierry Ashanti as Victor
 Stanislas Crevillén as Franck

Production
Exteriors were filmed in Chaville, Clamart, Suresnes, and central Paris. Interiors were shot in Studios Éclair in Epinay-sur-Seine.

Release
The film was first released in France, Belgium, and Switzerland. Later the film was shown at the L'Alliance Française French Film Festival in Australia, the Miami Gay and Lesbian Film Festival, the Newport International Film Festival, and the Seattle International Film Festival, and went into limited release in the US.

Reception

Critical reception
The Closet holds a 85% approval rating on review aggregator website Rotten Tomatoes, based on 80 reviews.

Stephen Holden of the New York Times called it "giddy social comedy" and "a classic French farce" and added, "What's so liberating about The Closet is its refusal to walk on politically correct eggshells. The target of its blunt lusty humor is as much exaggerated political correctness and the panic it can engender as it is bigotry."

Roger Ebert of the Chicago Sun-Times said, "The movie passes the time pleasantly and has a few good laughs ... But the screenplay relies too much on the first level of its premise and doesn't push into unexpected places. Once we get the setup, we can more or less anticipate the sitcom payoff, and there aren't the kinds of surprises, reversals and explosions of slapstick that made La Cage Aux Folles so funny. In the rating system of the Michelin Guide, it's worth a look, but not a detour or a journey."

Peter Travers of Rolling Stone called the film "a bonbon spiked with mirth and malice" and noted, "Auteuil and Depardieu spar hilariously, and writer-director Francis Veber, following The Dinner Game, offers another delicious treat."

Lisa Schwarzbaum of Entertainment Weekly rated the film A−, calling it a "cagey, high gloss comedy" and a "perfectly built French tickler."

Box office
The film grossed an estimated $25 million in France from more than 5 million admissions. It was the third highest-grossing film in France during 2001 behind Amélie and La Vérité si je mens ! 2. It grossed $6,678,894 in the US and Canada and $18 million in other foreign markets for a worldwide box office of $50,104,745.

Awards and nominations
Daniel Auteuil was named Best Actor at the Shanghai International Film Festival.

References

External links

2001 films
2001 comedy films
French comedy films
2000s French-language films
French LGBT-related films
Films directed by Francis Veber
Films with screenplays by Francis Veber
Films scored by Vladimir Cosma
Films shot in France
2000s French films